Lim Dong-ki (born 1 August 1959) is a South Korean sport shooter who competed in the 1984 Summer Olympics.

References

1959 births
Living people
South Korean male sport shooters
Skeet shooters
Olympic shooters of South Korea
Shooters at the 1984 Summer Olympics
Shooters at the 1986 Asian Games
Shooters at the 1990 Asian Games
Asian Games medalists in shooting
Asian Games silver medalists for South Korea
Asian Games bronze medalists for South Korea
Medalists at the 1986 Asian Games
Medalists at the 1990 Asian Games
20th-century South Korean people
21st-century South Korean people